Alexander Chekurov (Russian: Александр Николаевич Чекуров, born 26 May 1974) is a Paralympic swimmer from Russia competing mainly in category S11 events.

Alexander won the bronze medal in the 50m freestyle at the 2008 Summer Paralympics as well as finishing seventh in the 100m freestyle and competing in the heats of the 100m butterfly

References

External links
 

Paralympic swimmers of Russia
Swimmers at the 2008 Summer Paralympics
Swimmers at the 2012 Summer Paralympics
Paralympic bronze medalists for Russia
Living people
1974 births
Medalists at the 2008 Summer Paralympics
S11-classified Paralympic swimmers
Paralympic medalists in swimming
Russian male freestyle swimmers
Russian male butterfly swimmers
20th-century Russian people
21st-century Russian people